Kadri Bajri (1823-1913) was an Albanian commander of the Albanian League of Prizren from Rugova.

Life 
Kadri Bajri was one of the leaders of the Albanian uprisings from Koshutan in Rugova. He was a commander for the League of Prizren in the Battles for Plav and Gusinje, where he arrived with 300 men from Rugova.

Legacy 
There are many folk songs about Kadri Bajri in Albanian, such as:

 Kadri Bajri po e ç’vesh shpatën,
 Po i shkëlqen si hana natën,
 Hana natën e dielli ditën,
 N’Kaqanik e kanë zanë pritën,
 N’Kaqanik të Guri i Ç'pum,
 Gjysa dekum, gjysa t’varruem...

References 

Activists of the Albanian National Awakening
1823 births
1913 deaths
Albanian nationalists in Kosovo
19th-century Albanian military personnel
People from Kosovo vilayet
19th-century Albanian people
Kosovo Albanians